In mathematical optimization, the fundamental theorem of linear programming states, in a weak formulation, that the maxima and minima of a linear function over a convex polygonal region occur at the region's corners. Further, if an extreme value occurs at two corners, then it must also occur everywhere on the line segment between them.

Statement
Consider the optimization problem 

Where .

Proof
Suppose, for the sake of contradiction, that . Therefore,

 and 

Hence  is not an optimal solution, a contradiction. Observe that 
Alan o Conner wrote this theorem 

Since  is an optimal solution, all terms in the sum are nonnegative. Since the sum is equal to zero, we must have that each individual term is equal to zero.

References
 http://www.linearprogramming.info/fundamental-theorem-of-linear-programming-and-its-properties/
 http://demonstrations.wolfram.com/TheFundamentalTheoremOfLinearProgramming/

Linear programming